Lafayette Fresco Thompson Jr. (June 6, 1902 – November 20, 1968) was an American Major League Baseball second baseman and executive. Thompson was born in Centreville, Alabama. In 1916, when he was 14, his family moved to New York City, where Thompson attended George Washington High School and Columbia University. At Columbia, he was a football teammate of Lou Gehrig's, but Thompson left the school to turn professional before he could join Gehrig on the Lions' baseball team.

Playing career
His pro career began at the Class D level of the minors in 1923. After three years of seasoning, he made his debut in September  with the eventual world champion Pittsburgh Pirates. Following brief appearances with the Pirates (14 games in 1925) and New York Giants (two games in ), Thompson was traded to the Philadelphia Phillies in  when the Giants obtained Rogers Hornsby. He had his most productive years with the Phils, playing in Baker Bowl, twice hitting over .300. Overall, in 669 games played for four teams over all or parts of nine National League seasons (1925–32; 1934), Thompson batted .298 in 2,560 at bats. His 762 hits included 149 doubles, 34 triples and 13 home runs, and he collected 249 RBI. He finished his career with a .962 fielding percentage.

Dodger executive
Thompson moved up the executive ladder, and survived the front-office purge that followed Branch Rickey's departure in October . During the shakeup, Thompson became a vice president and the team's second-ranking baseball executive, responsible for all minor league operations, while another VP, Buzzie Bavasi, assumed control of the big-league Dodgers' operations. Over Thompson's 22 years as a senior farm system executive, the Dodgers produced six National League Rookie of the Year Award winners, and won ten NL pennants and four World Series titles.

When Bavasi left to become president of the expansion San Diego Padres on June 4, 1968, Thompson became the Dodgers' executive vice president and general manager. During the transition, he presided over the Dodgers' hugely successful 1968 amateur draft. The regular and secondary phases of the 1968 June lottery netted the Dodgers Steve Garvey, Davey Lopes, Ron Cey, Bill Buckner, Bobby Valentine, Joe Ferguson, Doyle Alexander and others.

However, a few weeks after his promotion, Thompson was diagnosed with cancer, and he died in November in Fullerton, California, at the age of 66. He was succeeded as general manager by the club's scouting director, Al Campanis. The following season, Ted Sizemore, developed in Thompson's farm system, was named the  NL Rookie of the Year.

References

External links

Corbett, Warren, Fresco Thompson. Society for American Baseball Research Biography Project

1902 births
1968 deaths
Baseball executives
Baseball players from Alabama
Birmingham Barons managers
Birmingham Barons players
Brooklyn Dodgers executives
Brooklyn Dodgers players
Brooklyn Dodgers scouts
Brooklyn Robins players
Buffalo Bisons (minor league) players
Columbia Lions baseball players
Deaths from cancer in California
George Washington Educational Campus alumni
Hartford Bees players
Jersey City Skeeters players
Kansas City Blues (baseball) players
Los Angeles Dodgers executives
Major League Baseball farm directors
Major League Baseball general managers
Major League Baseball second basemen
Minneapolis Millers (baseball) players
Minor league baseball managers
Montreal Royals managers
Montreal Royals players
New York Giants (NL) players
Omaha Buffaloes players
People from Centreville, Alabama
Philadelphia Phillies players
Pittsburgh Pirates players
Reading Brooks players
Baseball players from New York City
Williamsport Grays players